Brian Johnston (born July 28, 1968) is an American mixed martial artist and professional wrestler who competed throughout the mid 1990s, most notably in the Ultimate Fighting Championship and New Japan Pro-Wrestling. His effective mix of precision striking and ground fighting, as seen with other fighters such as Marco Ruas, would set the standard for what are now common traits in modern-day fighting styles. Johnston holds a black belt in Judo and was a former Golden Gloves champion.

He fought many MMA legends in their prime such as Don Frye, Mark Coleman and Ken Shamrock while competing in the UFC.

Brian suffered a massive stroke in August 2001 while in Japan prior to a fight, at 32 years of age and 3 weeks after his wedding.

Initially trained by Brad Rheingans. He made his pro wrestling debut in 1997, losing to Naoya Ogawa at NJPW G1 Climax Special 1997. Throughout his whole career Johnston was used as a tag team wrestler, teaming with such names like Don Frye, Osamu Kido, Tadao Yasuda, Dave Beneteau, and Kazuyuki Fujita. He had a notable appearance at the 1999 G1 Tag League, teaming with Takashi Iizuka. After a massive stroke, he was forced to retire in 2001. Johnston would train several team mates to impressive MMA victories, over notables such as Mark Kerr, K-1 fighter Jan Nortje and MMA fighters Ryan Gracie and Ken Shamrock.

Mixed martial arts record

| Loss
|align=center| 5–5
| Dan Bobish
| Submission(forearm choke)
| UFC 14
| 
|align=center| 1
|align=center| 2:10
| Birmingham, Alabama, United States
|
|-
| Win
|align=center| 5–4
| John Renfroe
| Submission (choke)
| Strikeforce - Strike Force
| 
|align=center| 1
|align=center| 2:10
| San Jose, California, United States
|
|-
| Loss
|align=center| 4–4
| Kimo Leopoldo
| Submission (forearm choke)
| Ultimate Explosion
| 
|align=center| 1
|align=center| 1:43
| Honolulu, Hawaii, United States
|
|-
| Win
|align=center| 4–3
| Dennis Reed
| Submission (rear-naked choke)
| Extreme Challenge 3
| 
|align=center| 1
|align=center| 0:48
| Davenport, Iowa, United States
|
|-
| Win
|align=center| 3–3
| Egidio Amaro da Costa
| TKO (submission to punches and headbutts)
| Universal Vale Tudo Fighting 5
| 
|align=center| 1
|align=center| 1:34
| Brazil
|
|-
| Loss
|align=center| 2–3
| Ken Shamrock
| Submission (forearm choke)
| Ultimate Ultimate 1996
| 
|align=center| 1
|align=center| 5:48
| Birmingham, Alabama, United States
|
|-
| Loss
|align=center| 2–2
| Mark Coleman
| TKO (submission to punches)
| UFC 11
| 
|align=center| 1
|align=center| 2:20
| Augusta, Georgia, United States
|
|-
| Win
|align=center| 2–1
| Reza Nasri
| TKO (punches)
| UFC 11
| 
|align=center| 1
|align=center| 0:28
| Augusta, Georgia, United States
|
|-
| Loss
|align=center| 1–1
| Don Frye
| TKO (submission to elbow)
| UFC 10
| 
|align=center| 1
|align=center| 4:37
| Birmingham, Alabama, United States
|
|-
| Win
|align=center| 1–0
| Scott Fiedler
| TKO (submission to punches)
| UFC 10
| 
|align=center| 1
|align=center| 2:25
| Birmingham, Alabama, United States
|

References

External links
 
 

Living people
American male mixed martial artists
Mixed martial artists utilizing judo
Mixed martial artists utilizing wrestling
Mixed martial artists utilizing boxing
American male professional wrestlers
American male judoka
Sportspeople from San Jose, California
1968 births
Professional wrestlers from California
Ultimate Fighting Championship male fighters